Musicians who play the harpsichord are known as harpsichordists. This list includes post 19th-century harpsichordists. Notable earlier harpsichordists mostly appear on the list of Baroque composers.

A
 Abraham Abreu
 Isolde Ahlgrimm
 Rinaldo Alessandrini
 Tori Amos
 Bob van Asperen
 Emilie Autumn
 Valda Aveling

B
 Enrico Baiano
 Ivor Bolton
 Michael Borgstede
 Hendrik Bouman
 Bradley Brookshire

C
 Nellie Chaplin
 Elisabeth Chojnacka
 William Christie
 Grant Colburn
 Elaine Comparone
 Gary Cooper
 Mónica Cosachov
 Alan Cuckston
 Laurence Cummings
 Alan Curtis

D
 Ottavio Dantone
 Thurston Dart
 Fernando De Luca
 Huguette Dreyfus

E
 Richard Egarr
 Mahan Esfahani

F
 Albert Fuller

G
 Anne Gallet
 Martin Galling
 Lorenzo Ghielmi
 Kenneth Gilbert
 Lillian Gordis

H

 Malcolm Hamilton
 Pierre Hantaï
 Barbara Harbach
 Ketil Haugsand
 Anton Heiller
 Robert Hill
 Asako Hirabayashi
 Christopher Hogwood

J
 Eileen Joyce

K

 Rudolf Kelber
 Ralph Kirkpatrick
 Igor Kipnis
 Ton Koopman
 Nicholas Kraemer

L
 Marcelle de Lacour
 Wanda Landowska
 Cosimo Damiano Lanza
 Gustav Leonhardt
 Raymond Leppard
 Christiana Lin
 Giedrė Lukšaitė-Mrázková

M
 Marie Antoinette
 Nicholas McGegan
 George Malcolm
 Alessandro De Marchi
 Sylvia Marlowe
 Mitzi Meyerson
 Patrick Montan
 Domenico Morgante
 Davitt Moroney
 Lars Ulrik Mortensen
 Oscar Milani

N
 Nikolaus Newerkla
 Anthony Newman
 Hervé Niquet

P
 Temple Painter
 Joseph Payne
 Martin Pearlman
 Yella Pessl
 Daniel Pinkham
 Trevor Pinnock
 Rafael Puyana

R

 Mario Raskin
 Karl Richter
 Jean Rondeau
 Scott Ross
 Christophe Rousset
 Gilbert Rowland
 Zuzana Růžičková

S
 Byron Schenkman
 János Sebestyén
 Liselotte Selbiger
 Skip Sempé
 Luciano Sgrizzi
 Millicent Silver
 Heather Slade-Lipkin
 Andreas Staier
 Masaaki Suzuki
 Simone Stella

T
 Colin Tilney
 Yann Tiersen 
 Rosalyn Tureck

V
 Fernando Valenti
 Jos Van Immerseel
 Blandine Verlet
 Robert Veyron-Lacroix
 Jory Vinikour

W
 Helmut Walcha
 Peter Watchorn
 Guy Whatley
 Blanche Winogron
 Ernst Victor Wolff
 Violet Gordon-Woodhouse

 
Harpsichordists